

Göscheneralpsee is a reservoir in the municipality of Göschenen, Canton of Uri, Switzerland.

See also
List of lakes of Switzerland
List of mountain lakes of Switzerland

External links

Stausee Kraftwerk Göschenen  

Reservoirs in Switzerland
RGöscheneralp
Lakes of the canton of Uri